Yury Mefodievich Solomin (born June 18, 1935 in Chita) is a Soviet and Russian actor and director who has been art director of the Maly Theatre in Moscow since 1988. Minister of Culture of the RSFSR in 1990-1991.

Biography 
Solomin studied at the Malyi theatre school and joined its troupe in 1957. He was acclaimed as Khlestakov in Igor Ilyinsky's production of The Government Inspector (1966), Tsar Feodor in Tsar Feodor Ioannovich (1976), Slavin in TASS Is Authorized to Declare... TV series (1984), Nicholas II in Az Vosdam... (1990), and Famusov in his own production of Woe from Wit (2000). Solomin was cast as a Russian imperial officer in many Soviet movies, including Akira Kurosawa's Dersu Uzala (1975), which won him a Japanese decoration for the outstanding contribution to the world culture (1993).

Solomin served as the Russian Minister of Culture from 1990 to 1992. March 11, 2014 signed the appeal of culture of the Russian Federation in support of the policies of Russian President Vladimir Putin in Ukraine and Crimea. In December 2015, he supported the policy of Putin with respect to Ukraine and the annexation of the Crimea.

His younger brother Vitaly Solomin (1941–2002) was also a noted actor.

Honors and awards

 People's Artist of Kyrgyzstan (1996)
 Honored Worker of Arts of the Republic of Mari El
 Order of Friendship of Peoples (1985)
Hero of Labour of the Russian Federation (2020)
 People's Artist of the USSR (1988)
People's Artist of the RSFSR (1974)
Honored Artist of the RSFSR (1971)
 Vasilyev Brothers State Prize of the RSFSR (1971) - for his role of Captain Koltsov in the mini-series The Adjutant of His Excellency (1969)
 Award of the KGB (1984) - for his role as Slavin in the mini-series TASS Is Authorized to Declare... (1984)
 Award for student work in Bratislava (Slovakia) and Kobe (Japan)
 Order "For Merit to the Fatherland";
1st class (29 June 2015) 
2nd class (18 June 2005)
3rd class (25 October 1999)
4th class (29 May 1995)
 Order of the Academy of Arts of Japan "for contribution to world culture" (No. 199)
 "Golden Aries" award for his outstanding contribution to the development of national cinema (1996)
 State Prize of the Russian Federation (2001)
 International Stanislavsky Theater Award - for his role in the play Famusov Maly, "Woe from Wit" (2001)
 Medal "In memory of Kazan 1000th anniversary" (2009)
 Award of Kuzbass (2007)
 Commemorative Medal "150th anniversary of Anton Chekhov" (2011)
 10054 Solomin - asteroid number 10054, named in his honor
 Award "Man of the Year 2008" (Russian Biographical Institute)
 Honorary Member of the Russian Academy of Arts
 Corresponding Member of Russian Academy of Education (1992)
 Award of the Federal Security Service in the "acting job" for the creation of highly image security personnel in the domestic film industry (2010)
 Order of Honour (2010)
 Order of Holy Prince Daniel of Moscow (Russian Orthodox Church)
 Medal "Glory of Chita» (No. 1) 
 Order of the Rising Sun, 3rd Class, Gold Rays with Neck Ribbon (Japan, 2011)

Selected filmography 
 A Mother's Heart (1965)
 Strong with Spirit (1967)
 The Adjutant of His Excellency (1969)
 The Red Tent (1969)
 Dauria (1971)
 Dersu Uzala (1975)
 Melodies of a White Night (1976)
 An Ordinary Miracle (1978)
 School Waltz (1978)
 Die Fledermaus (1979)
 Moon Rainbow (1983)
 TASS Is Authorized to Declare... (1984)
 Sofia Kovalevskaya (1985)
 Anna Karamazoff (1991)
 Dreams of Russia (1992)
 Moscow Saga (2004)

References

External links

 
 Solomin's page at the Malyi Theatre's website 

1935 births
20th-century Russian male actors
21st-century Russian male actors
Living people
People from Chita, Zabaykalsky Krai
Academicians of the National Academy of Motion Picture Arts and Sciences of Russia
Communist Party of the Soviet Union members
Honorary Members of the Russian Academy of Arts
Honored Artists of the RSFSR
People's Artists of the RSFSR
People's Artists of the USSR
Full Cavaliers of the Order "For Merit to the Fatherland"
Recipients of the Order of Friendship of Peoples
Recipients of the Order of Holy Prince Daniel of Moscow
Recipients of the Order of Honour (Russia)
Recipients of the Order of the Rising Sun, 3rd class
Recipients of the Vasilyev Brothers State Prize of the RSFSR
State Prize of the Russian Federation laureates
Russian male film actors
Russian male stage actors
Russian male television actors
Russian theatre directors
Soviet male film actors
Soviet male stage actors
Soviet male television actors
Soviet theatre directors